Kero Kero Bonito (KKB) are a British indie pop band formed in South London in 2011. The band consists of vocalist Sarah Midori Perry and producers and multi-instrumentalists Gus Lobban and Jamie Bulled.

Their musical style consists of indie pop, electropop, dance-rock, hyperpop, and bubblegum pop. The band's earlier work was influenced by J-pop such as Kyary Pamyu Pamyu, as well as dancehall, and video game music; however, following their 2018 EP TOTEP their sound and influences diversified, with their second studio album, Time 'n' Place, being influenced by indie rock contemporaries such as Mount Eerie and My Bloody Valentine. Perry, who is half-Japanese, sings and raps in both Japanese and English.

History

Lobban and Bulled grew up in Bromley in the suburbs south of London and met in their teens. In search for a new band member, they posted advertisements, including on MixB, an online bulletin board for Japanese expatriates, largely due to their interest in "Japanese rap". Perry was one of the first respondents. They selected her based on her background in art, and their interest in her bilingual ability. Although she had collaborated with a Japanese girl group previously, Perry did not have a background in professional singing; instead, she was interested in collaborating with Lobban and Bulled simply because she "wanted to try it".

The trio called themselves Kero Kero Bonito; its meaning is intentionally ambiguous, with one derivation from the Japanese onomatopoeic words for frog croaks and a type of fish. Other meanings include the Brazilian quero-quero bird while "bonito" means "pretty" in both Portuguese and Spanish, thus "Pretty Quero-quero" – or even "I want, I want pretty" in a rough translation.

The group released their debut mixtape Intro Bonito through Double Denim Records in August 2014. They wrote many of their songs featured on the mixtape using a Casio SA-45 mini-keyboard. The band contributed "Flamingo" to Ryan Hemsworth's compilation EP shh#ffb6c1.

In September 2014, Kero Kero Bonito released Bonito Recycling, a compilation of Intro Bonito remixes by artists including Danny L Harle and Spazzkid. The band released the single "Build It Up", on which Perry sings in a call and response pattern, in November 2014.

On 10 August 2015, Kero Kero Bonito announced their first North American tour, which took place during October 2015.

On 21 October 2016, the group released their first album Bonito Generation through Double Denim.

On 2 February 2017, the YouTuber Berd published a parody animation of the band's single "Flamingo". The video went viral, and became an internet meme, surpassing 24 million views as of January 2022.

On 12 February 2018, the band released the single "Only Acting". It departs from the band's previous electronic sound with a darker, rock-influenced style. Later, on 20 February 2018, the band released the EP TOTEP. The EP included "Only Acting", and other songs following the rock-influenced style.

On 13 April 2018, the band performed their first 'full band' show. This involved two extra members, James Rowland on electric guitar and Jennifer Walton on drums and sampler, as well as Lobban on drums and keyboards and Bulled on bass guitar. Rowland previously played guitar on TOTEP. This change in live line-up reflected their change in sound following the EP.

On 8 May 2018, the band released the single, "Time Today", and announced their second studio album, Time 'n' Place, which was released on 1 October 2018. The album was sonically a significant departure from their previous studio album, and was inspired by radical changes in the band's personal lives following their tour cycle for their debut album.

On 8 July 2019, the band uploaded "KKB Life" to YouTube, a vlog video recorded during the Time `n` Place era, announcing that a new era is starting. They announced a North America and Europe tour shortly after and released a new single "When the Fires Come" in September 2019. Later on in the month, before the tour started, they also released their fourth EP Civilisation I.

In 2020, the band wrote and performed "It's Bugsnax!", the theme song for the video game Bugsnax, which was featured in its announcement trailer.

In April 2021, Kero Kero Bonito released their fifth EP, Civilisation II.

In September 2021, Kero Kero Bonito released "rom com 2021", a remix of Soccer Mommy's single "rom com 2004". The song was released under the 23rd instalment of Adult Swim's Singles Series.

Band members and solo work

Sarah Midori Perry
Sarah Midori Perry, also known as Sarah Bonito and Cryalot, is the lead singer of the band. On 30 June 2022, Perry released "Hell Is Here", her debut single under her solo project Cryalot and the lead single to her debut solo EP Icarus, which was released on 2 September 2022.

In addition to her solo work she has featured on many other projects. Electronic musician Spazzkid was a fan of Kero Kero Bonito and enlisted Perry to rap on "Truly" from his 2014 Promise EP. In 2014 she was also featured on the track "Horsey" by Macross 82-99.  In 2015 she was featured on "Everyday", the debut single by producer Chroma-kei. In 2021 she featured on A. G. Cook's remix album Apple vs. 7G, performing vocals on the remix version of "The Darkness" alongside Hannah Diamond. In 2022 she was featured on the track "STARSTUD" by Matt Watson from his first full-length album, SEE YOU THERE.

Extended plays
Icarus  (2022)

Singles
"Fly Away"  (2014)
"The Darkness (Remix)"  (2021)
"Airport Dreams"  (2021)
"Hell Is Here"  (2022)
"Touch the Sun"  (2022)
"Labyrinth"  (2022)

Gus Lobban

Gus Lobban, also known as Kane West and Augustus, provides drums, keyboards, sampler, background vocals, and production for the band. He won a remix contest for Tiga's "Let's Go Dancing" with Audion. He contributed to PC Music's mix for DISown. He later released his Western Beats EP through the label. Tiny Mix Tapes ranked the EP 31st on their list of "Favorite 50 Music Releases of 2014", and Fact placed Western Beats 33rd on its year-end list. The following year, his song "T.R.U.E.L.O.V.E." appeared on Folie Douce's second Confessions compilation. In August 2015, Kane West released the EP Expenses Paid on Turbo Recordings. Since 2016, Lobban has used this alias mainly to release remixes, with the exception of "Definitely Come Together", a collaboration with Cecile Believe released through PC Music during their Month of Mayhem.

As well as Kane West, Lobban also releases solo work as Augustus, a project influenced heavily by Japanese city pop music. Under this name he has released an original song entitled "Vs." (as part of a promotional compilation for Zoom Lens), as well as cover versions of songs by GFOTY and Perfume. He also provides vocals on the song "Money Won't Pay" by fellow London musician bo en. In addition to these two projects, Lobban co-wrote and produced two tracks on Saint Etienne's 2017 album Home Counties. 

Extended plays
Western Beats  (2014)
Expenses Paid  (2015)
DJ Move Your Body  (2020)

Singles
"Vs."  (2013)
"I Guess It Really Didn't Matter"  (2013)
"Wonder2"  (2014)
"Thank You Stephanie"  (2014)
"T.R.U.E.L.O.V.E."  (2015)
"Definitely Come Together"  (2017)

Jamie Bulled
Jaime Bulled, also known as Wharfwhit, performs keyboards, electric guitar, bass guitar, sampler, and production for the band. Prior to Kero Kero Bonito, Bulled was a member of the band Kabogaeries. Since forming Kero Kero Bonito, Bulled now records music under the name Wharfwhit, with the 2016 single 'Elbows' and 2017 albums 'Evidently' and 'WHARFWHAT!?' released under this name. In December 2021, Bulled released the double A-side single 'Strictly Dumb Dancing / Live Laugh Love London', under the moniker The JLB. The two tracks are in a UK garage style.

Mixtapes
Wharfwhat?  (2017)

Extended plays
Evidently  (2017)
@ My Whit's End  (2018)
Legit  (2020)
Jamie Loves Bangers  (2022)

Singles
"Elbows"  (2016)
"Little Pebbles in My Sock"  (2017)
"Hooha!"  (2017)
"I'd Say Croydon"  (2019)
"Strictly Dumb Dancing" / "Live Laugh Love London"  (2021)

Live band members
The band perform live as both a traditional band, and as a trio using a sequencer and samplers. The full live band consists of these members:

 Sarah Bonito – lead vocals, keyboards
 Gus Lobban – backing vocals, keyboards, drums
 Jamie Bulled – bass guitar
 Jennifer Walton – drums, sampler
 James Rowland – guitar

Discography

Releases 
Intro Bonito  (2013)
Bonito Generation (2016)
Time 'n' Place (2018)
Civilisation (2021)

Awards and nominations

References

External links

 
 
 

English synth-pop groups
Musical groups from London
Musical groups established in 2011
2011 establishments in England
Polyvinyl Record Co. artists
Sony Music Entertainment Japan artists
Art pop groups
British indie pop groups
Hyperpop musicians